James Cerretani and Max Schnur were the defending champions but chose not to defend their title.

Federico Gaio and Andrea Pellegrino won the title after defeating Blaž Rola and Jiří Veselý 7–6(7–4), 7–6(7–5) in the final.

Seeds

Draw

References
 Main Draw

Città di Caltanissetta - Doubles
2018 Doubles